Ukraine sent a delegation to compete at the 2008 Summer Paralympics in Beijing.

Ukrainian athletes competed in athletics, judo, table tennis, wheelchair volleyball, swimming and weightlifting.

Medallists

Sports

Archery

Men

|-
|align=left|Pavlo Nazar
|align=left|Men's individual compound W1
|676
|8
|Bye
|L 110-109
|colspan=4|did not advance
|-
|align=left|Taras Chopyk
|align=left|Men's individual recurve W1/W2
|636
|1
|Bye
|L 100-107
|colspan=4|did not advance
|-
|align=left|Serhiy Atamanenko
|align=left rowspan=2|Men's individual recurve standing
|510
|23
|L 73-95
|colspan=5|did not advance
|-
|align=left|Yuriy Kopiy
|576
|18
|W 102-91
|L 94-100
|colspan=4|did not advance
|-
|align=left|Serhiy Atamanenko Taras Chopyk Yuriy Kopiy
|align=left|Men's team recurve
|1722
|8
|
|W 185-181
|L 187-188
|colspan=3|did not advance
|}

Women

|-
|align=left|Roksolana Dzoba
|align=left rowspan=3|Women's individual recurve W1/W2
|519
|12
|Bye
|W 87-83
|L 83-99
|colspan=3|did not advance
|-
|align=left|Larysa Mikhnyeva
|451
|18
|L 70-83
|colspan=5|did not advance
|-
|align=left|Iryna Volynets
|562
|5
|Bye
|L 83-87
|colspan=4|did not advance
|-
|align=left|Bohdana Nikitenko
|align=left|Women's individual recurve standing
|536
|14
|W 82-79
|L 78-99
|colspan=4|did not advance
|-
|align=left|Roksolana Dzoba Bohdana Nikitenko Iryna Volynets
|align=left|Women's team recurve
|1617
|4
|colspan=2 
|L 162-166
|colspan=3|did not advance
|}

Athletics

Men's track

Men's field

Women's track

Women's field

Football 7-a-side

The men's football 7-a-side team won the gold medal after defeating Russia in the gold medal match.

Players
Volodymyr Antonyuk
Oleksandr Devlysh
Taras Dutko
Ihor Kosenko
Mykola Mikhovych
Denys Ponomaryov
Anatolii Shevchyk
Ivan Shkvarlo
Kostyantyn Symashko
Vitaliy Trushev
Andriy Tsukanov
Serhiy Vakulenko

Tournament

Semifinals

Gold medal match

Judo

Men

Women

Powerlifting

Men

Women

Rowing

Men

Shooting

Men

Women

Swimming

Men

Women

Table tennis

Men

Women

Volleyball

The women's volleyball team didn't win any medals, they were 5th out of 8 teams.

Players
Anzhelika Churkina
Oleksandra Granovska
Larys Klochkova
Galyna Kuznetsova
Liubov Lomakina
Alla Lysenko
Inna Osetynska
Margaryta Pryvalykhina
Ilona Yudina

Tournament
Group A matches

5-8th Classification

5th-6th match

Wheelchair fencing

Men

Women

See also
2008 Summer Paralympics
Ukraine at the Paralympics
Ukraine at the 2008 Summer Olympics

External links
Beijing 2008 Paralympic Games Official Site
International Paralympic Committee

References

Nations at the 2008 Summer Paralympics
2008
Paralympics